Botunje is a village in the Kragujevac city area in the Šumadija District of central Serbia. It is located north-east of the city.  According to the 2011 census, the village has a population of 669 people.

References

Populated places in Šumadija District